The Amagodani Formation is an Early Cretaceous geologic formation in Japan. An indeterminate iguanodontian tooth has been recovered from the formation. as well as indeterminate pterosaur remains. Dinosaur footprints are also known from the formation.

See also 
 List of dinosaur-bearing rock formations
 List of stratigraphic units with indeterminate dinosaur fossils

References

Bibliography 
 Weishampel, David B.; Dodson, Peter; and Osmólska, Halszka (eds.): The Dinosauria, 2nd, Berkeley: University of California Press. 861 pp. 

Geologic formations of Japan
Lower Cretaceous Series of Asia
Valanginian Stage
Sandstone formations
Mudstone formations
Deltaic deposits
Ichnofossiliferous formations
Fossiliferous stratigraphic units of Asia
Paleontology in Japan